The oceanic puffer, sci-name: Lagocephalus lagocephalus (meaning "rabbit head"), is a pufferfish of the family Tetraodontidae, found in all tropical and subtropical oceans, at depths of between 10 and 475 m. Though indigenous to the Pacific, Atlantic and Indian oceans as well as the Sea of Japan, a surge in its distribution throughout the Mediterranean Sea has been reported in years of recent. Its length is up to 61 cm. It is thought to be responsible for fatal poisoning and should therefore not be eaten.

References

Sources
 
 Tony Ayling & Geoffrey Cox, Collins Guide to the Sea Fishes of New Zealand,  (William Collins Publishers Ltd, Auckland, New Zealand 1982) 
Coro, Gianpaolo, et al. “Forecasting the Ongoing Invasion of  Lagocephalus Sceleratus  in the Mediterranean Sea.” Ecological Modelling, vol. 371, 2018, pp. 37–49., doi:10.1016/j.ecolmodel.2018.01.007.

Marine fish of Europe
Lagocephalus
Fish described in 1758
Taxa named by Carl Linnaeus